Cheshmeh Dara (also Romanized as Cheshmeh Dārā; also known as Sharif ʿAlī) is a village in Kuhdasht-e Shomali Rural District, in the Central District of Kuhdasht County, Lorestan Province, Iran. At the 2006 census, its population was 54, in 8 families.

References 

Towns and villages in Kuhdasht County